Brothers of the 4×4 is the ninth studio album by American country music artist Hank Williams III, released on October 1, 2013, along with A Fiendish Threat. Williams is credited as "Hank 3" on the cover. Clocking in at 89 minutes and 17 seconds, Brothers of the 4x4 is Williams' longest studio album to date, overtaking 2006's Straight to Hell, which is two minutes shorter.

Commercial performance
In its first week of release, the album debuted at number 10 on the US Top Country Albums chart, and sold 6,000 copies.

Track listing

Chart performance

References

External links
 Official site

Hank Williams III albums
2013 albums
Curb Records albums